O'Dea High School is a Catholic all boys high school founded in 1923 and is located in Seattle's First Hill neighborhood. The school is named after Edward John O'Dea who was bishop of Seattle when the school was built. O'Dea is a part of the Archdiocese of Seattle.

Of its 507 students in four grades in 2020, 60% were Catholics, 58% were Caucasian, 13% were African American, and 19% were multi-racial. There are 36 instructors and the student-teacher ratio is 14 to 1. The tuition at O'Dea High School for the 2019-2020 school year was $16,576; the school provides over $1 million in financial aid every year.

Clubs
O'Dea High School has many school clubs, each supported and sponsored by the school by a yearly club fair and funds from the school's treasury. A list of some O'Dea Clubs:
Black Students United For Excellence(BSUE)
Latino Heritage Club
O'Dea  100 Club
Asian and Pacific Islander Heritage Club 
Japanese Cultural Club
Korean Cultural Club
National Honor Society - O'Dea Chapter
Junior State of America - O'Dea Chapter
Knowledge Bowl Club
Service Club
Chess Club
Student Ambassadors
Rhythm & Poetry
Student Advisors for Equity
eSports
Digital Media Club (DMC)
Technology Ambassadors
O’Dea Design Club
Investment Club
Korean Club

Athletics
O'Dea High School has had many notable alumni go on to great success in College and Professional athletics.  A list of currently offered sports by season:
 Fall: Cross Country, Football, Golf
 Winter: Basketball, Swimming, Wrestling
 Spring: Baseball, Golf, Lacrosse, Soccer, Tennis, Track

Notable alumni

Patrick Henry Brady, Major General, U.S. Army (retired), Vietnam Medal of Honor and Distinguished Service Cross recipient.
Chris Banchero, current professional basketball player
Paolo Banchero, NCAA basketball player for Duke and first overall pick in the 2022 NBA draft. 
Kevin Burleson, NBA player
Nate Burleson, NFL wide receiver
Fred Couples, professional golfer
Demetrius DuBose, former NFL player
Myles Gaskin, American football running back for the Miami Dolphins
Allen Greene, director of athletics of Auburn University and former baseball player at Notre Dame and New York Yankees
Charles Greene, U.S. Olympic gold medalist
Eddie Henderson, former pro soccer, quoted as notable player in for Wichita Kansas Wings MISL team, and former US National Team Youth player.
John Matsudaira (1922–2007), an American painter.
Mich Matsudaira (1937–2019), an American businessman and civil rights activist. 
Paul Matsudaira, an American biologist.
Taylor Mays (born 1988), NFL free safety with Cincinnati Bengals; former USC Trojan
John Navone, SJ, Jesuit priest, theologian, author, and retired Professor Emeritus of the Pontifical Gregorian University. 
Clint Richardson Jr. (born 1956), NBA player
Geoff "InControl" Robinson, professional StarCraft player and commentator
J. Kevin Waters, Jesuit priest, composer, academic administrator, and Professor Emeritus of Music at Gonzaga University.
DeAndre Yedlin (born 1993), full-back for MLS football club Inter Miami CF

Controversies 
In 2012, the principal of O'Dea at the time, Brother Walczak was accused of sexually abusing a minor in the 1970s. Walczak denied the allegations but resigned as principal.

References

External links

High schools in King County, Washington
Congregation of Christian Brothers secondary schools
Catholic secondary schools in Washington (state)
Schools in Seattle
Boys' schools in the United States
Educational institutions established in 1923
Schools accredited by the Northwest Accreditation Commission
High schools within the Archdiocese of Seattle
First Hill, Seattle
1923 establishments in Washington (state)